Sudden Weekly was a women's magazine published in Hong Kong by Jimmy Lai's Next Media Limited from 1995 until 2015. The magazine featured articles on celebrities and targeted women. It ceased publication on 7 August 2015.

Scoops
Issue 493 of the magazine (dated 7 January 2005 but delivered to newsstands on the night of 6 January) carried a story that included photographs of Director of the Chief Executive's Office Lam Woon-kwong with a woman outside a hotel in Tokyo and an interview with his wife of nearly 30 years. Lam resigned on the same evening, citing "in view of the media report on my private affairs, I tendered my resignation to the chief executive today".

References

External links
 Sudden Weekly

Astro Malaysia Holdings
Astro Malaysia Holdings subsidiaries
Celebrity magazines
Chinese-language magazines
Defunct magazines published in Hong Kong
Magazines established in 1995
Magazines disestablished in 2015
Weekly magazines published in Hong Kong
Women's magazines